The Deposition or Lamentation over the Dead Christ is a c. 1618-20 painting by the Flemish painter Anthony van Dyck. It is now in the Kunsthistorisches Museum, in Vienna, which it entered in 1720.

References

1620 paintings
Religious paintings by Anthony van Dyck
Paintings in the collection of the Kunsthistorisches Museum
Paintings of the Descent from the Cross